William Henry "Bill" O’Callaghan (1868 – 16 January 1946) was an Irish hurler who played as a forward for the Cork senior team.

Born in Cork, O'Callaghan first arrived on the inter-county scene at the age of twenty-four when he first linked up with the Cork senior team. He made his senior debut during the 1892 championship. O'Callaghan immediately became a regular member of the team and won one All-Ireland medal and one Munster medal. In 1892 O'Callaghan captained the team to the All-Ireland title.

At club level O'Callaghan was a one-time championship medalist with Redmond's.

Throughout his career O'Callaghan made just two championship appearances. He retired from inter-county hurling following the conclusion of the 1893 championship.

References

1868 births
1946 deaths
Redmond's hurlers
Cork inter-county hurlers
All-Ireland Senior Hurling Championship winners